Patricia K. Quinn is a atmospheric chemist working at the National Oceanic and Atmospheric Agency's Pacific Marine Environmental Lab. She is known for her work on the impact of atmospheric aerosol particles on air quality and climate.

Education and career 
Quinn has an undergraduate degree from Reed College (1982). In 1988, she earned her Ph.D. from the University of Washington and transitioned into an associate professor position there. Starting in 1993 she also has a position at the Pacific Marine Environmental Lab of the National Oceanic and Atmospheric Agency.

In 2020, Quinn was appointed the editor-in-chief of the section on 'Aerosols' for the journal Atmosphere.

Research 
Quinn's early research was on ammonia where she made the first simultaneous measurements of ammonia in both the atmosphere and the ocean. She then linked the cycling of sulfur and nitrogen compounds over the Pacific Ocean and examined an enhancement in cloud condensation nuclei from the oxidation of the sulfur-containing compound dimethylsulfide, research which has implications for the role of sulfur compounds on climate. She has measured aerosol chemical compounds over the Atlantic Ocean, the Pacific Ocean, and in a time series dating back to 1997 at Utqiaġvik, Alaska. Her research includes investigations into the impact of airborne pollutants in the Arctic, the contribution of sea spray aerosol to cloud condensation nuclei, and the chemistry of sea spray aerosols.

Selected publications

Awards and honors 
 NOAA Administrator Award (2008)
 Fellow, American Geophysical Union (2010)
 U.S. Department of Commerce Bronze Medal Award (2010)
 Fellow, American Association for the Advancement of Science (2019)

References 

Reed College alumni
University of Washington alumni
National Oceanic and Atmospheric Administration personnel
Fellows of the American Geophysical Union
Living people
Women atmospheric scientists
Year of birth missing (living people)